The Cobbler's Cottage is a ca-1870 historic cottage in the United States National Historic Landmark District – Beaufort Historic District. The Cobbler's Cottage is a contributing property, # U-13-1013, of the Beaufort Historic District making the cottage a recognized member of the “National Register of Historic Places”. The Cobbler's Cottage is located at Block 66, Lot C, 713 Charles Street, Beaufort, South Carolina.

Description and history

The city of Beaufort, SC was chartered in 1711 with the streets and blocks established along a bluff of the Beaufort River so homes could be built facing south to catch the southern breezes. Stately homes were built in a T-shape known as the Beaufort Style Architecture to enhance catching the breeze from the river. The Cobbler's Cottage is not one of the stately homes of the Plantation Planters but a cottage for the common working class that supplied services to the Planters in the area of Beaufort called “The Old Commons”.

The Cobbler's Cottage got its name due to having a cobbler's shop for many years (1899 ~ late as 1958) on the property in front of the Cottage on Charles Street.

References

External links
 Beaufort County Historic Site Survey, 1997, page 127, #U-13-1013.
 South Carolina, Beaufort, 1899 Sanborn Fire Insurance Map, sheet 5, corner Charles & Duke.

Houses in Beaufort, South Carolina